Pipalsana Chaudhari is a census town in Bareilly district in the Indian state of Uttar Pradesh.

Demographics
 India census, Pipalsana Chaudhari had a population of 7,964. Males constitute 53% of the population and females 47%. Pipalsana Chaudhari has an average literacy rate of 55%, lower than the national average of 59.5%: male literacy is 65%, and female literacy is 45%. In Pipalsana Chaudhari, 19% of the population is under 6 years of age.

References

Cities and towns in Bareilly district